The following is a list of American television and radio networks and announcers that have nationally broadcast the NBA All-Star Games throughout the years.

Television

2020s

2010s

2000s

Notes
The 2003 NBA All-Star Game on TNT marked the first time that the game was broadcast by a cable television network.

1990s

Notes
In 1991, Bob Costas filled in for Marv Albert on play-by-play for NBC's coverage, as Marv Albert was away grieving the death of his mother.

1980s

1970s

1960s

1950s

Notes
The 1959 NBA All-Star Game marked the first time that the game was nationally televised.  However, NBC only broadcast the second half at 10:00 pm. Eastern Time, in lieu of their Friday Night Fights telecast.

Pregame coverage

Radio

2020s

2010s

2000s

1990s

1980s

1970s

1960s

1950s

References

External links
NBA All-Star – Editions
NBA All-Star Game numbers game.
NBA All-Star Game - Series - TV Tango

All-Star Game broadcasters
Broadcasters
All-Star Game broadcasters
All-Star Game broadcasters
All-Star Game broadcasters
National Basketball Association All-Star Game broadcasters
National Basketball Association All-Star Game broadcasters
NBA All-Star Game broadcasters
National Basketball Association All-Star Game broadcasters
National Basketball Association All-Star Game broadcasters
National Basketball Association All-Star Game broadcasters
National Basketball Association All-Star Game broadcasters
Mutual Broadcasting System